The Boekenpauw, also known as the Yvonne Gillé-Decoeneprijs, is a Flemish award for a Flemish or Dutch illustrator for the best illustrations in a children's book.

History 

The Boekenpauw and Boekenpluim awards were established in 1989.

The award was not given in 2017 due to reorganisation at Boek.be and due to reassessment of what awards the organisation would continue to support. The award was given again in 2018 sponsored by association of authors, composers and publishers SABAM and GAU (Groep Algemene Uitgevers).

Gerda Dendooven won the Boekenpauw four times: in 1990, 1995, 2002 and 2007. Several illustrators have won the Boekenpauw twice: Carll Cneut (2000 and 2004), Goele Dewanckel (1999 and 2005), Ingrid Godon (2001 and 2015), Tom Schamp (2008 and 2013) en André Sollie (1998 and 2010).

Winners 

 1989: Koen Fossey, Moet je echt weg
 1990: Gerda Dendooven, IJsjes
 1991: Roland Vandenbussche (posthumously), Met weinig eerbied. Museumgids voor jongeren
 1992: Geert Vervaeke, Puntje puntje puntje
 1993: Lieve Baeten, Nieuwsgierige Lotje
 1994: Kristien Aertssen, Tante Nans zat op een gans
 1995: Gerda Dendooven, Strikjes in de Struiken
 1996: Anne Westerduin, Een koekje voor Blekkie
 1997: Marjolein Pottie, Muu
 1998: André Sollie, De brief die Rosie vond
 1999: Goele Dewanckel, Zeg me dat het niet zal sneeuwen
 2000: Carll Cneut, Willy
 2001: Ingrid Godon, Wachten op Matroos
 2002: Gerda Dendooven, Meneer Papier gaat uit wandelen
 2003: Klaas Verplancke, Heksje Paddenwratje
 2004: Carll Cneut, Mijnheer Ferdinand
 2005: Goele Dewanckel, Het mooie meisje
 2006: Isabelle Vandenabeele, Mijn schaduw en ik
 2007: Gerda Dendooven, Het verhaal van slimme Krol. En hoe hij aan de dood ontsnapte
 2008: Tom Schamp, De 6de dag
 2009: Sabien Clement, En iedereen ging op zijn mieren zitten
 2010: André Sollie, De Zomerzot
 2011: Ellen Vrijsen, Cantecleir
 2012: Leo Timmers, Boem
 2013: Tom Schamp, Het leukste abc ter wereld
 2014: Anton Van Hertbruggen, Het hondje dat Nino niet had
 2015: Ingrid Godon, Ik denk
 2016: Kitty Crowther, Mama Medusa
 2017: Not awarded
 2018: Marit Törnqvist, Het gelukkige eiland
 2019: Kaatje Vermeire, Ans & Wilma verdwaald
 2020: Sebastiaan Van Doninck, De fantastische vliegwedstrijd

References

External links 
 Boek.be (in Dutch)

Belgian literary awards
Awards established in 1989
1989 establishments in Belgium